Pratyabhijñāhṛdayam ('The Heart of Self-Recognition') is an eleventh-century treatise written by Kashmiri philosopher Rajanaka Kṣemarāja.

Overview 
The text elucidates the main tenets of the pratyabhijñā system in a succinct set of sutras, expounding the core of the philosophy and explaining how self-recognition arises within, culminating in the consciousness of 'Shivoham' (I am Shiva). Pratyabhijñāhṛdayam consists of 20 aphorisms plus a commentary by Kṣemarāja himself. 

It is considered to be an important text in Kashmir Shaivism.

External links 
  Interpretive translation of and commentary on the Pratyabhijñāhṛdayam

References

Hindu texts
Hindu literature